Andreas Bethmann is a German film director, producer, and screenwriter. Beginning his career making horror films, Bethmann moved on to hardcore pornography in the late 1990s, and then to fusions of the two genres, which typically feature prolonged scenes of rape, torture, and gore. His style of filmmaking has been compared to those of Joe D'Amato and Jesús Franco (who made cameo appearances in several of Bethmann's projects).

Along with making films, Bethmann distributes them through the label X-Rated Kultvideo, acts as editor for magazines such as X-Rated and Art of Horror, and has authored a number of books, including Deep Wet Torture Handbook, Freitag der 13. Chronicles, Jess Franco Chronicles, Deep Red Gore Handbook: Die 100 blutigsten Horrorfilme, Porno Holocaust - die Filme des Joe D'Amato and Über dem Jenseits - die Filme des Lucio Fulci.

Partial filmography 
Bethmann's films are usually released in multiple versions, such as censored or director's cuts. While his work is predominantly straight and lesbian-themed, a few of his films have had male on male scenes, examples of these being Notgeile Knastjulen zur Unzucht erzogen  and Angel of Death 2: The Prison Island Massacre.

References

External links 
 

Living people
German male film actors
Horror film directors
German magazine editors
20th-century German male actors
21st-century German male actors
Film distributors (people)
German film score composers
Male film score composers
German male composers
German pornographic film directors
German pornographic film producers
German magazine publishers (people)
1970 births
Directors of lesbian pornographic films